Pałecznica  is a village in Proszowice County, Lesser Poland Voivodeship, in southern Poland. It is the seat of the gmina (administrative district) called Gmina Pałecznica.

See also
 Lesser Polish Way

References

Villages in Proszowice County
Kielce Governorate
Kielce Voivodeship (1919–1939)